The Monastery of Virgin Mary in Koskam or Deir el-Muharraq, also known as the Muharraq Monastery, Virgin Mary monastery and Mount Koskam Monastery, is a monastic complex of the Coptic Orthodox Church of Alexandria in Egypt.

Geography
The Deir el-Muharraq complex is located on the Nile just south of Cusae, in Asyut Governorate in Upper Egypt. It is south of Greater Cairo.

Features
The monastery is within the Coptic Orthodox Church of Alexandria diocese, with about 100 monks of Koinonia or community monasticism in residence.

The stone fortress on Mount Koskam at Muharraq Monastery was built in the 6th or 7th century. The fortress chapel has a 12th-century lectern, dating to when the fortress was first repaired.

The monastery's library has two entities, an ancient Coptic manuscripts library and archives, and a contemporary research and reading library.

Churches
The monastery complex has three churches: 

 12th century Virgin Mary's Ancient Church (with 16th and 19th century domes additions),
 19th century Neoclassical style St. George Church (1878-1880),
 Mid-20th century Holy Virgin Mary's Recent Church (1940-1964).

The Church of al-Adhra (Church of the Virgin) at the monastery was built over an ancient cave. It is claimed that Mary and Jesus spent six months and ten days here on their flight into Egypt from King Herod. The altar stone is dated 747 CE.

The monastery served as a host for Ethiopian monks in 17th century.

Many Coptics hold this church in high veneration, believing it to be one of the first Christian churches in ancient Egypt.  It was associated with a Marian visionary event claimed in the early 2000s.

Arson of 2013
In August 2013, rioters committed arson, setting fire to the Muharraq Monastery.

Its archival manuscript library holds, or held, many ancient Coptic manuscripts dating back as early as the 13th century. Another section contained a collection of thousands of modern books and reference material dating from the 19th and 20th centuries.  The flames from the monastery's substantial fire reached surrounding Coptic homes in the complex, destroying 15 and damaging others. The fate of the ancient Coptic manuscripts and the monastery's 2 libraries is unknown.

See also
Coptic architecture 
Coptic Orthodox monasteries
Christian monasteries in Egypt
Persecution of Copts

References

External links

—Almuharraqmonastery.com: Official al-Muharraq Monastery website

Coptic Orthodox monasteries in Egypt
Buildings and structures in Asyut Governorate
Coptic history
Persecution of Copts
Terrorist incidents in Egypt in 2013
Arson in Africa
Islamist attacks on churches
Religiously motivated violence in Egypt